is a Japanese badminton player affiliated with NTT East team. She was the bronze medalist in the 2016 World Junior Championships in the girls' singles event. She had won South Australia International event in 2018 and Laos International event in 2019.

Achievements

BWF World Junior Championships 
Girls' singles

BWF International Challenge/Series (2 titles, 4 runners-up) 
Women's singles

  BWF International Challenge tournament
  BWF International Series tournament
  BWF Future Series tournament

References

External links 

1998 births
Living people
Sportspeople from Ishikawa Prefecture
Japanese female badminton players
21st-century Japanese women